Kangerosithyris is a genus of moths belonging to the family Tineidae.

There is presently only one species in this genus: Kangerosithyris kotomsarensis  Skalski, 1992 that is a cave-dwelling moth and is known from India.

References

Tineinae